Antonio Cezar Peluso (born 3 September 1942) is a Brazilian jurist. He was a member of the Supreme Federal Court (in Portuguese: Supremo Tribunal Federal (STF)) and has been the Court's Chief Justice from April 2010 to April 2012 (in Portuguese: Presidente do Supremo Tribunal Federal).

Peluzo was born in Bragança Paulista, São Paulo. At the time of his retirement, he was one of the two members of the Court with a prior career as a judge (beside Luiz Fux). He is known for his collected demeanor and his ample juridical knowledge, even among Brazil's most important jurists. When Peluso became the President of the STF, analysts such as journalist Elio Gaspari pointed out that his reserved style is a contrast to that of Gilmar Mendes, Peluso's predecessor, who is regarded as a more outspoken figure. However, both judges often agree on juridical decisions; they generally stand on the Court's conservative and textualist wing. On December 16, 2010, he stated that the Supreme Court of Brazil would not review the Amnesty Law on the part which grants immunity to prosecution for former torturers of the oppressive military regime that, after the 1964 coup, installed a 20-year-long dictatorship in Brazil.

As the Chief Justice of the Supreme Federal Tribunal, Peluso also headed the National Justice Council.

He experienced his mandatory retirement on September 3, 2012.

References

1942 births
Brazilian academics
20th-century Brazilian judges
21st-century Brazilian judges
Supreme Federal Court of Brazil justices
Living people
University of São Paulo alumni
People from Bragança Paulista